The St Mary's Church is a Church of England parish church at Thatcham in the English county of Berkshire. It is dedicated to the Virgin Mary and is a Grade II* listed building.

It has been claimed that the church was founded in the 7th century by St Birinus, and parts of the church date from the 12th century.

Tower and bells

The tower contains a peal of 10 change ringing bells. The oldest bells (5th–9th) date from 1624 and were cast by Ellis I Knight of Reading. The newest bells (1 and 2) date from 1969 and were cast by John Taylor & Co. The tenor bell (cast in 1825) weighs 13-0-23 (671 kg) and rings out the note 'F'. The bell ringers practise on a Tuesday night from 7:30pm till 9:15pm. They also ring on a Sunday from 9:15am till 10am.

Treble: 3cwt, John Taylor 1969 in A

2nd: 3cwt, John Taylor 1969 in G

3rd: 4cwt, John Taylor 1929 in F

4th: 4cwt, John Taylor 1929 in E

5th: 5cwt, Ellis I Knight 1624 in D

6th: 6cwt, Ellis I Knight 1624 in C

7th: 6cwt, Ellis I Knight 1624 in Bb

8th: 7cwt, Ellis I Knight 1624 in A

9th: 10cwt, Ellis I Knight 1624 in G

Tenor: 13cwt, Thomas II Mears 1825 in F

References

External links

Official Site
St Mary's Church Thatcham on berkshirehistory.com

Church of England church buildings in Berkshire
English churches with Norman architecture
Grade II* listed churches in Berkshire
St Mary's Church
Diocese of Oxford